Not Today, Thank You is a British radio comedy featured on BBC Radio 4. It stars Harry Shearer (known for the Simpsons and This Is Spinal Tap) as Nostrils, a man convinced that he is extremely unattractive, and Brian Hayes as Brian Hughes, an aging radio presenter who tries to broadcast his radio show from his grandmother's basement before being met by a TV producer.

Cast
Deborah O'Brien - Jean
Brian Hayes -  Brian Hughes
Alex Lowe - Neville/Reggie
Andrew McGibbon - Rolf/professor
Mark Perry - Donny/TV producer
Nick Romero - Colonel
Harry Shearer - Announcer/Nostrils
Sheridan Smith - Showbiz Kat

External links
Official BBC Radio 4 website profile
Not Today, Thank You on BBC News 
Not Today, Thank You on Radiotimes

BBC Radio comedy programmes